A Technical Standard Order (TSO) is a minimum performance standard issued by the United States Federal Aviation Administration for specified materials, parts, processes, and appliances used on civil aircraft.  Articles with TSO design approval are eligible for use on the United States type certified products by following a much lighter process than similar non-TSO approved part, provided the TSO standard meets the aircraft requirements. The TSO authorization (also called TSOA) or a letter of TSO Design Approval does not necessarily convey approval for installation. See 14 CFR Part 21 Subpart O.

Similar standards are maintained by other aviation authorities. For example European Technical Standard Order (ETSO) by EASA for the European Union, with limited reciprocal equivalence on a per-country basis.

See also
Type certificate
Supplemental type certificate

References

External links
FAA page on Technical Standard Orders
What is TSO? TSO FAQ.

Avionics
Aviation licenses and certifications
Federal Aviation Administration